Robert H. "Three-Fingered" Birch, born Robert Henry Birch (c. 1827 – c. 1866), was a 19th-century American adventurer, criminal, soldier, lawman, postmaster, and prospector. He was a member of the infamous "Banditti of the Prairie" in his youth, whose involvement in the torture-murder of Colonel George Davenport in 1845 led to his turning state's evidence against his co-conspirators. Birch was also the discoverer of the Pinos Altos gold mine with Jacob Snively and James W. Hicks. During the American Civil War, he served in the American Southwest with the Confederate forces of the Arizona Rangers and 2nd Texas Cavalry.

Early life
Robert Birch claimed to have been born in New York, but amateur detective, Edward Bonney alleged, that Birch's father, John "Old Coon" Birch, Sr., stated, in their home, which was nine miles southwest of Marshall, in Clark County, Illinois, that Robert had been born in North Carolina. Birch had moved with his father and his two brothers, John, Jr. and Timothy, to Illinois, as a child.

Criminal pursuits in Middle West

Banditti of the Prairie
Robert Birch became involved in crime, as a teenager, being described by Bonney, as "suspected of robbery and even of murder ever since he had attained the age of fifteen". Robert Birch was a close associate of bandit, William Fox, as both were considered notorious "prairie pirates" and longtime members of what were called the Banditti of the Prairie. Birch was a self-styled Mormon, who conveniently, used his church membership, as a Latter Day Saint, to gain protection in Nauvoo, Illinois, when the law was hot on his trail.

Alleged criminal connections with John A. Murrell
Robert Birch, may have had ties to Tennessee outlaw, John A. Murrell and his Mystic Clan, using a number of criminal aliases including; Robert Harris, R. Harris, R. Haris, Haris, Owin, Haines, Gains, Thomas Brown, Tom Brown, Robert Blecher, R. H. Blecher. But, this claim does not hold up to scrutiny, as Birch would have been only seven years old, in 1834, when Murrell was arrested and began serving his ten-year prison sentence. Robert Birch, more likely, might have had older relatives, such as his father, uncles, or cousins, who were on the Mystic Clan's membership rolls in the U.S. Southern states or were connected to outlaws who were Murrell associates. After the demise of Murrell, many of the members of the future "Banditti" were driven out of "The South" and to avoid arrest, execution, or death at the hands of regulators and moved farther north, relocating their criminal activities in the still, lawless, frontier of the Middle West, mainly in the states of Illinois, Indiana, and Ohio.

Torture-murder of Colonel Davenport, arrest, and escape
Robert Birch, when he was 18 years old was alleged, by James Henry Tevis, of being involved in the torture-murder of Colonel George Davenport, at his home, on July 4, 1845.
Robert Birch was one, of several members, later, identified by Edward Bonney, who had infiltrated the gang as a bogus counterfeiter. Ironically, three years earlier, Bonney had been arrested and charged with counterfeiting in Indiana but, escaped before his conviction. Birch was soon apprehended, in part to information from Bonney, and he soon agreed to testify against the others in exchange for a reduced sentence. Granville Young and brothers, John and Aaron Long were later, executed for the murder. After several court delays, Robert Birch broke out of jail, through outside help or bribery, in Knoxville, Illinois, March 22, 1847.

Honest pursuits in New Mexico Territory

New Mexico Gold Rush
Disappearing into the frontier, of the Midwest United States, Robert Birch resurfaced, almost, a decade later, a reformed, honest man and an associate of Jacob Snively, the  founder of Arizona's first gold rush boom town Gila City, and became the first postmaster on December 24, 1858. Two years later, Birch followed Snively and James W. Hicks to the New Mexico Territory where they discovered gold deposits on Bear Creek. A mining camp soon sprang up around the claim, on the site of what is today the ghost town of Pinos Altos, and was originally named Birchville in his honor.

American Civil War service
When the Confederate Army invaded the territory of New Mexico, at the start of the American Civil War, they created the Confederate Territory of Arizona Robert Birch possibly because of his southern family leanings volunteered for military service. He initially served with Company A, Arizona Rangers under 2nd Lieutenant James Henry Tevis however, according to Tevis, Birch asked to be transferred to  Colonel John Salmon Ford's Second Texas Cavalry on the Rio Grande.

Death
Robert Birch died in 1866, in Arizona Territory, present-day Arizona.

References

Books
 Bonney, Edward. The Banditti of the Prairies, Or, The Murderer's Doom!!: A Tale of the Mississippi Valley. Norman: University of Oklahoma Press, (1850) 1963.
 Tevis, James H. Arizona in the '50s. Albuquerque: University of New Mexico Press, 1954.
 Thrapp, Dan L. Encyclopedia of Frontier Biography: In Three Volumes, Volume I (A-F). Lincoln: University of Nebraska Press, 1988.
 Wellman, Paul L. Spawn of Evil. Doubleday and Company, 1964.

1820s births
1860s deaths
American male criminals
American escapees
American prospectors
Fugitives
People from Illinois
People from New Mexico